Low Fulney is a hamlet in the South Holland district of Lincolnshire, England. It is in the Spalding St. Paul's ward of the South Holland District Council.

Thornholme Grange, a house of 15th-century origin, was built of brick on the supposed site of Spalding Priory dairy. It was extended and partially rebuilt in the 16th century. It was altered in the 19th century, and again in 1936 when acquired by the Land Settlement Association.

References

External links

South Holland, Lincolnshire
Hamlets in Lincolnshire